François Amégasse Akol (born 10 October 1965) is a Gabonese former footballer who played as a defender. He was capped 110 times by the Gabon national team, scoring nine goals, and represented Gabon at the 1994, 1996 and 2000 African Cup of Nations. Amégasse captained Gabon at the 2000 African Cup of Nations finals.

After he retired from playing, Amégasse continued to be involved in football. He was named an ambassador to the 2017 Africa Cup of Nations finals in Gabon.

See also
 List of men's footballers with 100 or more international caps

References

External links

1965 births
Living people
Gabonese footballers
Association football defenders
Gabon international footballers
FIFA Century Club
1994 African Cup of Nations players
1996 African Cup of Nations players
2000 African Cup of Nations players
Mbilinga FC players
Petrosport F.C. players
21st-century Gabonese people